Youssef Tourabi (born 18 April 1989) is a Moroccan footballer, who is currently attached to Moghreb Tétouan.

Career
He began his career with Wydad Casablanca and signed on 3 June 2008 here his first professional contract between 30 June 2013.

International career
Tourabi played his first international game for the senior team from Morocco against Oman national football team.

References

External links
 
 
 Youssef Tourabi at Footballdatabase

Living people
1989 births
Moroccan footballers
Morocco international footballers
People from Ben Guerir
Morocco under-20 international footballers
Wydad AC players
AS FAR (football) players
KAC Kénitra players
Olympic Club de Safi players
RS Berkane players
Fath Union Sport players
Moghreb Tétouan players
Botola players
Association football defenders